Hayton is a civil parish in the Carlisle district of Cumbria, England.  It contains 33 listed buildings that are recorded in the National Heritage List for England.  Of these, two are listed at Grade II*, the middle of the three grades, and the others are at Grade II, the lowest grade.  The parish contains the villages of Hayton and Talkin, and the smaller settlements of Heads Nook, Corby Hill, Faugh, Fenton, and Greenwell, and is otherwise rural.  The listed buildings include houses and associated structures, farmhouses, farm buildings, churches and associated structures, bridges, milestones, public houses, a war memorial, and a school.


Key

Buildings

References

Citations

Sources

Lists of listed buildings in Cumbria